Shim Eun-kyung (born May 31, 1994) is a South Korean actress. She has starred in the box office hits Sunny (2011), Miss Granny (2014) and Fabricated City (2017), as well as television series Naeil's Cantabile (2014). In 2020, she became the first Korean to win Best Actress at the Japanese Academy Awards (Japan's equivalent of the Oscars).

Career
Shim made her acting debut at age 9 in the 2004 TV series The Woman Who Wants to Marry, and subsequently made a career as one of the best child actresses of her generation. She first gained attention for her role as a sexually abused girl in the horror fairytale Hansel and Gretel, and also starred in TV series such as Hwang Jini, The Legend, Women of the Sun, and The Great Merchant; critics say at times she even outshined her adult counterparts.

In 2011, she successfully transitioned to a lead actress via the retro dramedy Sunny, which tells the story of seven women, crosscutting between their lives in the present and the experiences that first brought them together as teenagers in the 1980s. Distinguished for its period detail, witty dialogue and the performances of its ensemble cast, the film shattered the common belief that women-centered pictures can't achieve blockbuster-level success. By appealing to a wide range of age groups, Sunny'''s box office total stood at more than 7 million admissions at the end of its long run. Director Kang Hyeong-cheol described Shim as someone "who is already complete as an actress."

Shim's other notable roles include a girl caught amidst the Korean War in black comedy Kyung-sook, Kyung-sook's Father (also known as My Dad Loves Trouble), a sister with seemingly supernatural abilities in Possessed, a depressive in The Quiz Show Scandal, and a court taster in Masquerade.

In the 2014 comedy Miss Granny, Shim played a woman in her 70s who miraculously finds herself back in her 20-year-old body. She said, "This film is quite close to my heart as it is the first film for me to star in not as a child actor, but as full-fledged actress." With 8.65 million admissions, its box office success surpassed Sunny's, proving Shim's ability to carry a film. She also won Best Actress at the Chunsa Film Art Awards, the Baeksang Arts Awards, the Director's Cut Awards, and the Buil Film Awards.

Shim next starred as the eccentric savant pianist heroine in Naeil's Cantabile, a Korean drama adaptation of Japanese manga Nodame Cantabile. However, the series was a critical and commercial flop, and Shim was criticized for her acting in the series.

Shim returned to film, starring in animated prequel Seoul Station directed by Yeon Sang-ho, revenge thriller Missing You, and Queen of Walking, which Shim calls a turning point in her career. In 2017, she starred alongside Ji Chang-wook in the action thriller Fabricated City and alongside Choi Min-shik in the election film The Mayor. In 2018, she starred in The Princess and the Matchmaker, the second installment of the "divining art trilogy" after The Face Reader; and black comedy film Psychokinesis.

In 2019, Shim made her Japanese film debut in The Journalist and gained good reviews for her performance as a Japanese reporter who delves into a government corruption scandal targeting the Abe administration. She won the Best Actress award at the Mainichi Film Awards, and subsequently the Best Actress award at 43rd Japanese Academy Awards in the following year after. She also starred in the film Blue Hour, a story of an unusual friendship. She won the Best Actress award at the Takasaki Film Festival for her performance.

In 2020, Shim returned to Korean entertainment with the finance drama Money Game.

In 2022, Shim was invited sit on the jury bench of the 35th Tokyo International Film Festival.

Personal life
Shim is the youngest daughter in her family. Her hobbies are listening to music, reading science fiction comics, and doing taekwondo. She is the drummer of a band she formed with friends, Chick and Candy.

After graduating from Eonbuk Elementary School and Cheongdam Middle School, in 2010 Shim temporarily quit acting to move to the U.S., explaining, "I chose a place where there aren’t a lot of Korean people and decided on a high school in Pittsburgh. Studying is a goal, but I also chose this because I've grown tired mentally and physically after having acted since a young age." She finished her high school at the Professional Children's School in 2013.

She shot a commercial with rocker Seo Taiji in 2008 and played the younger version of Lee Ji-ah's character Sujini in The Legend, but she didn't know that Lee and Seo were secretly married until 2011 when Shim was implicated in rumors that she was Seo and Lee's daughter, which she denied.

Originally nominated for the Best Actress award at the 2011 Grand Bell Awards for her role in Sunny, Shim complained publicly through her Twitter account when the awards committee removed her name from the official list of the nominees after she notified them she could not attend the event because she was currently studying in the U.S. She was one of four actors and actresses removed from the initial nomination. Shim ended up winning Best Supporting Actress for her role in Romantic Heaven; Chun Woo-hee, her castmate in Sunny'', accepted the honor on Shim's behalf.

Filmography

Film

Television series

Web series

Hosting

Discography

Awards and nominations

Accolades
In September 2022, she was appointed to the committee at the 35th Tokyo International Film Festival.

References

External links

 Shim Eun-kyung at A.N.D Entertainment 
 
  
  
 
 
 

1994 births
Living people
21st-century South Korean actresses
South Korean film actresses
South Korean television actresses
South Korean child actresses
Best Actress Paeksang Arts Award (film) winners